Dubianaclia butleri is a moth of the subfamily Arctiinae. It was described by Paul Mabille in 1884. It is found on Madagascar.

References

Arctiinae
Moths described in 1884